Joseph J. Holup (February 26, 1934 – January 28, 1998) was an American basketball player. He played college basketball for George Washington University and later professionally in the National Basketball Association and the Eastern Professional Basketball League.

College career
A 6'6' forward, Holup starred at George Washington University from 1953 to 1956. He tallied 2,226 points and 2,030 rebounds in 104 varsity games, and led the NCAA in rebounds per game (25.6) during the 1955–56 season. Holup held George Washington's record for most career points until 2003, when he was surpassed by Chris Monroe. He ranks second among NCAA Division I rebounding leaders with his 2,030 career rebounds.

Professional career
After college, Holup was selected with the fifth overall pick of the 1956 NBA draft by the Syracuse Nationals. He played three seasons in the NBA with the Nationals and Detroit Pistons, averaging 7.0 points per game and 4.4 rebounds per game. He later played several seasons in the Eastern Professional Basketball League. He spent the 1959–1960 season with the Williamssport Billies where he averaged 12.4 points and 6.9 rebounds. He was named the Billies acting head coach for the remainder of the season in February 1960 after head coach Bobby Sand was injured in an automobile accident. He started the following season with the Baltimore Bullets before being obtain by the Wilkes-Barre Barons in a cash deal in January 1961.

Death
Holup died in Rexford, New York in 1998.

See also
 List of NCAA Division I men's basketball players with 2000 points and 1000 rebounds
 List of NCAA Division I men's basketball career free throw scoring leaders
 List of NCAA Division I men's basketball season rebounding leaders
 List of NCAA Division I men's basketball career rebounding leaders

References

External links
NBA statistics at Basketball Reference
EPBL statistics at statscrew.com
College statistics at Sports Reference

1934 births
1998 deaths
All-American college men's basketball players
American men's basketball coaches
American men's basketball players
Basketball players from Pennsylvania
Detroit Pistons players
George Washington Colonials men's basketball players
People from Swoyersville, Pennsylvania
Philadelphia Warriors draft picks
Power forwards (basketball)
Syracuse Nationals draft picks
Syracuse Nationals players
Wilkes-Barre Barons players